The South East Community Development Council is one of five Community Development Councils (CDCs) set up across the Republic of Singapore to aid in local administration of governmental policies and schemes. They are funded in part by the government although they are free to engage in fund-raising activities.

The South East Community Development Council (CDC) was set up on 24 November 2001. Spanning the scenic eastern Coast of Singapore, the South East District is home to more than 551,000 residents. The District includes some of the island's most vibrant, historical and beautiful neighbourhoods, such as Geylang Serai, Joo Chiat, Bedok, Marine Parade and Serangoon Central.

Constituencies

As of March 2020, the South East district covers:

Single Member Constituency (SMC)
MacPherson SMC
Mountbatten SMC

Group Representation Constituency (GRC)
East Coast GRC
Bedok
Changi-Simei
Fengshan
Kampong Chai Chee
Siglap
Marine Parade GRC
Braddell Heights
Geylang Serai
Joo Chiat
Kembangan - Chai Chee
Marine Parade

Mayors 
The incumbent mayor of South East District is Mohd Fahmi Aliman of Marine Parade GRC since 2020.

External links
South East Community Development Council

References

Singapore government policies
Districts of Singapore
Organizations established in 2001
2001 establishments in Singapore